The abbatial church of Santa Maria della Sanità is located in Salita di Santa Maria della Sanità, in the Castelletto quarter of Genoa. Originally, it was the private chapel of villa De Mari (now villa Grüber). It was built in the 17th century by the Genoese nobleman Stefano De Mari, who bestowed it to the Descalced Carmelites of the nearby Church of Sant'Anna. It has a rare octagonal layout, a wide cupola and seven lateral chapels, which make it a jewel of the religious architecture of Genoa.

Bibliography 
 Catalogo delle Ville Genovesi, Italia Nostra, 1967 
 Guida d'Italia, Liguria, Touring Club Italiano, 2009

References

See also 
 Villa Gruber de Mari
 Sant'Anna, Genoa
 Castelletto
 Genoa

17th-century Roman Catholic church buildings in Italy
Santa Maria della Sanità